Kitzscher is a town in the Leipzig district, in Saxony, Germany.

Geography 
Kitzscher is situated in the Leipziger Tieflandsbucht, at the perimeter of the Central Saxon Hills. The town is situated 6 km northeast of Borna, and 24 km southeast of Leipzig. A nearby slagheap from open cast mining called the 'Halde Trages' is one of the highest points in the vicinity and the main sight of interest in the locality.

History 

The village was first mentioned in a charter document in the abbey at Grimma in the year 1251 which referred to a noble family, Guntherus de Kiczschere, which ultimately died out in 1676.

The oldest structure in the town is the church the origins of which date back to 1200.

References 

Leipzig (district)